The , is a Japanese school located at the Bonifacio Global City in Taguig, Philippines. It caters mainly to Japanese students who are residing in the Metro Manila area.

Location
Its first location was in Manila. After 10 years, it moved to Parañaque, where they stayed for almost 23 years. Finally, MJS moved to the University Parkway, Bonifacio Global City adjacent to British School Manila, International School Manila, Market! Market!, and Serendra.

It is attached to the Embassy of Japan, Manila.

References

Further reading

 Iwamoto, Hiromi (岩本 廣美 Iwamoto Hiromi; Sugimori Elementary School (東京都調布市立杉森小学校), Chofu City). "The Manila Japanese School Students' Recognition of Their Residence : An Analysis of Cognitive Maps" (マニラ日本人学校児童・生徒の在留地に関する地域認識 : 手描き地図の分析を通じて). Bulletin of the Center for Educations of Children Overseas Tokyo Gakugei University (東京学芸大学海外子女教育センター研究紀要) 4, 17-32, 1987-06. See profile at CiNii.
 小林 茂子. "Changes in Educational Activities in the Manila Japanese School before and after the Outbreak of the Pacific War : Supplementary Readers and Anthologies of Children's Compositions" (開戦前後におけるマニラ日本人学校にみる教育活動の変容 : 発行された副読本と児童文集を手がかりに). 日本研究 50, 235-257, 2014-09. 人間文化研究機構国際日本文化研究センター. See profile at CiNii.
 小林 茂子. "Education for Local Understanding on Japanese School in Manila before the War : Focusing on "Philippine Dokuhon" in 1938" (戦前期マニラ日本人学校における現地理解教育の取りくみ : 『フィリッピン読本』(1938年)の分析を中心に). 国際理解教育 18, 24-32, 2012-06. 日本国際理解教育学会. See profile at CiNii.
 山本 剛秀 (東京都三鷹市立羽沢小学校・マニラ日本人学校(前)). "マニラ日本人学校での現地理解教育 : 交流授業・現地素材の教材化を通して(第4章国際理解教育・現地理解教育)." 在外教育施設における指導実践記録 27, 61-64, 2004. Tokyo Gakugei University. See profile at CiNii.

External links

Manila Japanese School official website

See also
Japan–Philippines relations

Manila
Japan–Philippines relations
International schools in Metro Manila
Education in Bonifacio Global City
Educational institutions established in 1968
1968 establishments in the Philippines